Petre Bay is a large bay which comprises about half of the west coast of Chatham Island, the largest island in New Zealand's Chatham Islands archipelago.

References

Landforms of the Chatham Islands
Bays of the New Zealand outlying islands
Chatham Island